Telipna kigoma is a butterfly in the family Lycaenidae. It is found in the Mpanda and Kigoma regions of Tanzania. The habitat consists of riverine forests.

References

Endemic fauna of Tanzania
Butterflies described in 1978
Poritiinae